The Florida Department of Community Affairs (or DCA) issues permits for counties to change their growth plans, based on availability of public resources such as water, roads, schools and drainage canals.

References

Government of Florida